Eric Estornel, better known by his stage names Maceo Plex, Maetrik and Mariel Ito, is a Cuban-American DJ, techno music producer and DJ Awards winner, raised in Dallas and Miami.

Biography
He is best known for his diverse production style, which is influenced primarily by house and by techno but also elements of electro and tech house; He is a longtime performer in many of Ibiza's top clubs, including the now-closed Space and Amnesia, and since 2016 has hosted his own club night, Mosaic by Maceo, throughout the summer in Pacha.

In July 2017, Estornel released a new concept project titled Solar, named after his baby son. It is his third studio album, through which he wanted to create deeper, more meaningful connection with his audience. The project combined ambient electronica, breakbeats and melodies, with dub and techno flourishes and guest vocalists. Solar has been released on Lone Romantic, Estornel's new, electronica-based label.

The Return two-track EP under Clash Lion Records was released in September 2017, Estornel's first release as Maetrik since 2012's Unleash The Beast EP. In spring 2018 Estornel created CD - fabric98, his fabric mix debut which bears the name of his big-room, Ibiza-friendly alias, but it reflects the music he's made under various guises including Maetrik and Mariel Ito over the last 20 years. fabric98 mix is an artist paying homage to the respected CD series all the while staying true to his love of blending many genres into one journey filled mix. His most recent production is the album Mutant Series released in March 2019 on Ellum Audio. In 2021, he remixed Faithless' 1995 song Insomnia.

He currently resides in Barcelona, Spain with his wife and children.

Discography

Studio albums
 Life Index (Crosstown Rebels, 2011)
 Journey to Solar (Ellum Audio, 2016)
 Solar (Lone Romantic, 2017)
Mutant Series (Ellum Audio, 2019)

Singles and extended plays
 Maetrik / Maceo Plex - Clubs EP (Resopal Schallware, 2009)
 Vibe Your Love (Crosstown Rebels, 2010)
 Under the Sheets EP (No.19 Music, 2011) 	
 High & Sexy EP (Ellum Audio, 2011)
 Your Style (Crosstown Rebels, 2011)
 Sweating Tears EP (Crosstown Rebels, 2011)
 Maceo Plex & Elon - Bummalo EP (ReSolute Label, 2011)
 Odd Parents & Maceo Plex - Get Enough (Leftroom, 2012)
 Frisky (Crosstown Rebels,	2012)
 Jon Dasilva & Maceo Plex - Love Somebody Else (Ellum Audio, 2012) 	
 Space Junk (Ellum Audio, 2012)
 Jupiter Jazz (Maceo Plex & Danny Daze) - Booty Jazz (Ellum Audio, 2013)
 In Excess (Ellum Edits, 2013, uncredited)
 Maceo Plex & Maars featuring Florence Bird - Going Back (Ellum Audio, 2013)
 Conjure One (Ellum Audio, 2014)
 Conjure Two (Minus, 2014)
 Conjure Superstar (Kompakt, 2014)
 Conjure Infinity (Drumcode, 2014)
 Maceo Plex & Gabriel Ananda - Solitary Daze (Ellum Audio, 2014)
 Solar Sampler (Ellum Audio, 2015)
 Maceo Plex featuring C.A.R - Mirror Me (Kompakt, 2015)
 Journey to Solar (Ellum Audio, 2016)
 The Tesseract (Ellum Audio, 2017)
 Mutant 1 - Maceo Plex & Maars (Correspondant Music, 2018)
 Mutant 2 (Ellum Black, 2018)
 Mutant Robotics (Ellum Audio, 2018)
 Mutant Romance (MPLX, 2018)
 Maceo Plex & Program 2 - Revision feat. Giovanni (Ellum Audio, 2021)

Other tracks

Remixes

Unreleased edits and remixes

Maetrik discography

Studio albums
 Quality Exertion (Treibstoff, 2002)
 Casi Profundo (Treibstoff, 2005)
 My Cyborg Depths (as Mariel Ito) (SCSI-AV, 2005)

Singles and extended plays
 Connect (Treibstoff, 2001)	
 Bias Defiance EP (Chalant Music, 2002)
 Entering The Cycle EP (Immigrant, 2002)
 Maetrik / Brian Aneurysm - The Sober Scene (Iron Box Music, 2002)
 Remote EP (Iron Box Music, 2002)	
 The Fall Out EP (Intrinsic Design, 2002)
 Freaky Flow (Big Chief, 2003)
 Echando Alma EP (Morris Audio Citysport Edition, 2003)
 Force Feeling (Treibstoff, 2003)
 My Specs (Treibstoff, 2003)
 Being Used (Iron Box Music, 2004)
 Tiny Destructor (Treibstoff, 2005)
 Cologne And Back (Treibstoff, 2005)
 The Prophecy (Tic Tac Toe Records, 2006)
 Maetrik vs. Mariel Ito - Data Addict EP (Affected Music, 2006)
 Aggravate Me (Stil Vor Talent, 2006)
 Polygon Bug (Iron Box Music, 2007)
 Transform EP (Regular, 2007)
 Future Will Survive (Treibstoff, 2007)
 Sexus (Regular, 2007)
 Space Chronic EP (Mothership, 2008)
 Hardwire EP (Iron Box Music, 2008)
 Advanced Mechanics E.P. (Treibstoff, 2008)
 They Love Terror E.P. (Treibstoff, 2009)
 Melted Mind EP (Mothership, 2009)
 Envy (Dumb-Unit, 2009)
 Maetrik / Maceo Plex - Clubs EP (Resopal Schallware, 2009)
 Choose Your System (Adam Beyer's Remix) (Treibstoff, 2009)
 Gliding Blind E.P. (Audiomatique Recordings, 2010)
 Simon Wish VS. Cruz + Lati / Maetrik Feat. Kule Runner - Dawn's Highway / Snorkel (Cocoon Recordings, 2010)
 So Real (Dumb-Unit, 2010)
 Unleash The Beast EP (Ellum Audio, 2012)
 The Reason (Cocoon Recordings, 2012)
 The Entity (Truesoul, 2012)
 Return EP (Clash Lion, 2017)

References

Sources

Living people
American electronic musicians
1978 births
American DJs
DJs from Miami
American house musicians
Deep house musicians
House musicians
Progressive house musicians
Techno musicians
Electronic dance music DJs